The 1930 Michigan gubernatorial election was held on November 4, 1930. Republican nominee Wilber M. Brucker defeated Democratic nominee William Comstock with 56.88% of the vote.

General election

Candidates
Major party candidates
Wilber M. Brucker, Republican
William Comstock, Democratic 
Other candidates
Joseph Billups, Workers
George M. Campbell, Socialist
Duly McCone, Prohibition

Results

References

1930
Michigan
Gubernatorial
November 1930 events